Norris-Stirling House, also known as Mt. Pleasant, is a historic home located at Bel Air, Harford County, Maryland. It is composed of an early 19th-century fieldstone section and two later frame additions. In 1936, a lean-to addition and double-tiered porch were added.  The property also includes a large frame bank barn and corncrib, a stone springhouse, and a garage.

It was listed on the National Register of Historic Places in 1979.

References

External links
, including undated photo, Maryland Historical Trust website

Houses in Bel Air, Harford County, Maryland
Houses on the National Register of Historic Places in Maryland
Houses completed in 1803
National Register of Historic Places in Harford County, Maryland